The  Chicago Rush season was the 11th season for the franchise in the Arena Football League. The team was coached by Bob McMillen and played their home games at Allstate Arena. The Rush finished the season 10–8 and missed the playoffs for the first time in franchise history.

Standings

Schedule
The Rush began the season at home against the Tampa Bay Storm on March 10. Their regular season concluded on July 21 on the road against the Cleveland Gladiators.

Final roster

References

Chicago Rush
Chicago Rush seasons
Chicago